Vladimir Ivanovich Chestnokov ((30 March) 12 April 1904, St. Petersburg – 15 May 1968, Leningrad) was a Soviet film and theater actor, theater teacher. People's Artist of the USSR (1960). Winner of the Stalin Prize of the first degree (1950) and the USSR State Prize (1967). Member of the CPSU (b) since 1941.

Filmography 
 Professor Mamlock (1938) as Dr. Hellpach
 Fourth Рeriscope (1939) as Grigory Krainev, submarine commander
 The Defeat of Yudenich (1941) as Lyudenkvist
 Father and Son (1941) as Sergey
 Mittens (1942) as Fedya Dorozhkin (short)
 Marine Вattalion (1944) as commander
 Pirogov (1947) as Ipatov
 Alexander Popov (1949) as Lyuboslavsky
 Taras Shevchenko (1951) as Nikolay Chernyshevsky
 Belinsky (1953) as Nikolay Nekrasov
 The Gadfly (1955) as Domenichino
 His Тime will Сome (1958) as Fyodor Dostoevsky
 October Days (1958) as Vladimir Lenin
 I Love You, Life! (1960) as Topilin
 The Very First (1961) as Academician Andrey Arkadyev
 713 Requests Permission to Land (1962) as Richard Gunther
 Executions at Dawn (1964) as Dmitri Mendeleev
 Green Сoach (1967) as Sosnitsky
 Pervorossiyane (1967) as Lenin

References

External links 
 

1904 births
1968 deaths
Male actors from Saint Petersburg
Recipients of the Order of Lenin
Soviet male film actors
Soviet male stage actors
People's Artists of the USSR
People's Artists of the RSFSR
Honored Artists of the RSFSR
Stalin Prize winners
Recipients of the USSR State Prize
Communist Party of the Soviet Union members